Albert Von Tilzer (born Albert Gumm, March 29, 1878 – October 1, 1956) was an American songwriter, the younger brother of fellow songwriter Harry Von Tilzer. He wrote the music to many hit songs, including, most notably, "Take Me Out to the Ball Game".

Early life
He was born Albert Gumm, in Indianapolis, Indiana, United States. His parents, Sarah (Tilzer) and Jacob Gumbinsky, were Polish Jewish immigrants.  As a young man he worked briefly at his older brother Harry Von Tilzer's publishing company, and Albert's earliest songs were published by Harry.

Harry had adopted his mother's maiden name, Tilzer, as his own. He sought to make it sound even classier by tacking on the German nobiliary particle "Von." So impressive seemed the transformation that eventually all his brothers (Albert, Will, and Jules) had changed their last name to match his.

Career
Within a few years Albert formed his own firm, The York Publishing Company.

By 1913, Albert had closed The York Publishing Company and joined the firm of his brother Will Von Tilzer.

Albert Von Tilzer was a top Tin Pan Alley tune writer, producing numerous popular music compositions from 1900 continuing through the early 1950s. He collaborated with many lyricists, including Jack Norworth, Lew Brown, and Harry MacPherson. A number of his tunes were performed (and recorded) by jazz bands and continue to be played decades later.

His songs included "The Alcoholic Blues", "Au Revoir But Not Good Bye, Soldier Boy", "Chili Bean", "Dapper Dan", "Don't Take My Darling Boy Away", "Honey Boy", "I May Be Gone for a Long, Long Time", "(I'll Be With You) In Apple Blossom Time", "I'm Glad I'm Married", "I'm the Lonesomest Gal in Town", "I Used to Love You But It's All Over Now", "The Moon Has His Eye On You", "My Cutie's Due at Two-to-Two", "My Little Girl", "Oh By Jingo!", "Oh How She Could Yacki-Hacki, Wicki-Wacki, Woo" (interpolated into the show Houp La!, 1916, and recorded by Ida Adams), "Put on Your Slippers and Fill Up Your Pipe, You're Not Going Bye-Bye Tonight", "Put Your Arms Around Me Honey", "Roll Along, Prairie Moon", "Tell Me With Your Eyes", "Wait Till You Get Them Up in the Air, Boys", and hundreds of others.

"Take Me Out to the Ball Game" was listed as number 8 on the list of Songs of the Century.

Death
He resided in Beverly Hills, California. He died in Los Angeles, California.

Work on Broadway

 The School Girl (1904) – musical; featured songwriter for "Lonesome"
 Ziegfeld Follies of 1908 (1908) – revue; featured composer for "You Will Have to Sing an Irish Song", "Nothing Ever Troubles Me (Nothing Ever Ever Ever Hardly Ever Troubles Me)", and "Since Mother Was a Girl"
 The Happiest Night of His Life (1911) – play; composer
 Honey Girl (1920) – musical; composer
 The Gingham Girl (1922) – musical; composer
 Adrienne (1923) – musical; composer
 Three Doors (1925) – play; producer
 Burlesque (1927) – play; featured songwriter
 Diamonds – featured songwriter

References

External links
 Albert Von Tilzer on Parlorsongs.com
 Albert Von Tilzer on Songwriters Hall Of Fame
 
 Albert Von Tilzer recordings at the Discography of American Historical Recordings.
 Albert Von Tilzer cylinder recordings, from the UCSB Cylinder Audio Archive at the University of California, Santa Barbara Library.
 Sheet music for "Tell Me With Your Eyes, York Music Company, 1904.

1878 births
1956 deaths
Musicians from Indianapolis
Jewish American songwriters
American people of Polish-Jewish descent
Songwriters from Indiana
Indiana Historical Society
People from Beverly Hills, California
Songwriters from California